Maradona, sueño bendito (English: Maradona: Blessed Dream) is a biographical drama television series. The series stars Juan Palomino, Nazareno Casero, Nicolás Goldschmidt, Julieta Cardinali, Laura Esquivel, Mercedes Morán, Peter Lanzani, Leonardo Sbaraglia, Marcelo Mazzarello, and Pepe Monje. Before the series premiere, it was confirmed that the series was renewed for a second 10-episode season. The series premiered on October 29, 2021 on Amazon Prime Video.

Synopsis 
Maradona: Blessed Dream follows the controversial life of legendary footballer Diego Armando Maradona. A boy from Argentina with a dream of greatness, made his mark in the international football league, earning himself a well-deserved place in history. Living a life strewn with drugs, sex and public scrutiny, he played by his own rules regardless of the consequence. Watch the man who took the football world by storm and made his way into the hearts of millions.

Cast

Main 
 Juan Palomino as Diego Maradona
 Nazareno Casero as young Diego Maradona
 Nicolás Goldschmidt as teenage Diego Maradona
 Juan Cruz Romero as child Diego Maradona
 Julieta Cardinali as Claudia Villafañe
 Laura Esquivel as young Claudia Villafañe
 Mercedes Morán as Dalma Salvadora Franco "Doña Tota"
 Rita Cortese as old Doña Tota
 Pepe Monje as Diego Maradona Padre "Don Diego"
 Claudio Rissi as old Don Diego
 Leonardo Sbaraglia as Guillermo Coppola
 Jean Pierre Noher as old Guillermo Coppola
 Darío Grandinetti as César Menotti
 Nicolás Furtado as Daniel Passarella
 Marcelo Mazzarello as Carlos Bilardo
 Eva De Dominici as Lorena Gaumont
 Federico D'Elía as Fernando Signorini
 Tea Falco as Cristiana Sinagra
 Martín Piroyansky as Ricardo Suárez
 Peter Lanzani as Jorge Cyterszpiler

Recurring 
 Gerardo Romano as Carlos Ferro Viera
 Fernán Mirás as Francis Cornejo
 Giovanni Esposito as Corrado Ferlaino
 Francesc Orella as José Luis Núñez, president of F. C. Barcelona
 Leonard Kunz as Bernd Schuster
 Richard Sammel as Udo Lattek
 Riccardo Scamarcio as Carmine Giuliano
 Mauricio Dayub as Roque Villafañe
 Douglas Silva as Pelé
 Inés Palombo as Marílu
 Natalia Dal Molín as María Rosa "Mary" Maradona
 María Onetto as Mother of the Plaza de Mayo
 Esteban Recagno as Jorge Carrascosa
 Gabriel Schultz as Yayo Trotta
 Aarón Balderi as Peón
 Diego Martín Vásquez as Dr. Pastoni
 Antonio Braucci as Giuseppe Bruscolotti
 Romina Ricci
 Stefanía Roitman
 Mario Guerci as Jorge Taiana
 Maximiliano Ghione
 Osqui Guzmán
 Diego Alonso Gómez as Osvaldo
 Daniel Leonardo Quinteros as Capataz

Episodes

Season 1 (2021)

Production

Development 
In 2018, it was reported that Amazon Prime Video was developing a biographical series based on Diego Maradona's life. The series is written by Guillerno Salmerón and Silvina Olschansky and directed by Alejandro Aimetta.

Filming 
In 2019, the series was filmed in places such as Argentina, Barcelona, Naples, Seville, Italy and Mexico.

Release 
The series premiered on Amazon Prime Video on October 29, 2021.

Notes

References

External links
 

2021 Argentine television series debuts
2020s drama television series
Argentine drama television series
Association football television series
Biographical television series
Spanish-language television shows
Spanish-language Amazon Prime Video original programming
Cultural depictions of Diego Maradona